Eila Marjatta "Ellu" Pyrhönen (born 25 October 1945) is a retired Finnish swimmer who won a bronze medal in the 100 m butterfly at the 1966 European Aquatics Championships. She finished fourth in the same event at the 1964 Summer Olympics, becoming the first Finnish woman to reach Olympic finals in swimming.

In 1966, she was selected as the Finnish Sports Personality of the Year and in 2002 received the Finnish Pro Urheilu Sports Award.

References

1945 births
Finnish female butterfly swimmers
Swimmers at the 1964 Summer Olympics
Living people
Olympic swimmers of Finland
European Aquatics Championships medalists in swimming
Swimmers from Helsinki
20th-century Finnish women